The Hanging Captain is a 1932 mystery detective novel by the British writer Henry Wade. Wade was a writer of the Golden Age of Detective Fiction, best known for his series featuring Chief Inspector Poole. This was one of a number of stand-alone novels he wrote.

Synopsis
When an ex-Army officer is found hanging in his house, it at first looks like suicide. However rival investigations by Inspector Lott of Scotland Yard and Superintendent Dawle of the local county constabulary demonstrate it is in fact murder and a hunt begins for the culprit.

References

Bibliography
 Magill, Frank Northen . Critical Survey of Mystery and Detective Fiction: Authors, Volume 4. Salem Press, 1988.
 Reilly, John M. Twentieth Century Crime & Mystery Writers. Springer, 2015.

1932 British novels
Novels by Henry Wade
British mystery novels
British detective novels
British crime novels
British thriller novels
Constable & Co. books
Novels set in England